Samuel Fox or Foxe may refer to:
 Samuel Fox (industrialist) (1815–1887), British industrialist noted for developing the Paragon umbrella frame
 Samuel Fox (1781–1868), Nottingham philanthropist who started the Nottingham Building Society
 Samuel John Fox (1854–?), Ontario farmer and politician
 Samuel Fox (1884–1971), American music publisher, founder of Sam Fox Publishing Company
 Samuel Fox (1765–1851), Derby Justice of the peace; father of William Darwin Fox
 Samuel Fox and Company, a steel company near Sheffield, England
Samuel Foxe or Fox (1560–1630), English diarist and politician
Samuel Foxe (MP) for Knaresborough (UK Parliament constituency)
Sam Fox, an American businessman and former United States ambassador to Belgium

Fox, Samuel